Niederdonven is a small town in the commune of Flaxweiler, in south-eastern Luxembourg.  , the town has a population of 305.

Flaxweiler
Towns in Luxembourg